"Is It Love You're After?" is a 1979 song by Rose Royce from the album Rainbow Connection IV, which was the last album with lead singer Gwen Dickey before she left to embark on a solo career. It was also the band's fourth highest-charting single in the UK.

Chart performance

Samples
The hook/riff of the song was sampled for S'Express' 1988 song "Theme From S'Express," which reached no. 1 in the UK.

References

Rose Royce songs
1979 songs
1979 singles
Warner Records singles
Disco songs